WBXR (1140 AM) is a radio station licensed to Hazel Green, Alabama that serves the greater Tennessee Valley area. WBXR is licensed to New England Communications, Inc. It airs a "Christian ministry" format.

1140 AM is a United States, Canadian & Mexican clear-channel frequency, on which WRVA in Richmond, Virginia and XEMR-AM in Apodaca, Mexico are the dominant Class A stations.  As such, WBXR must leave the air during nighttime hours to protect the nighttime skywave signals of those Class A stations, but 24-hour programming of WBXR is available on an FM translator in Hazel Green, Alabama.

Programming
The bulk of WBXR programming comes from the Wilkins Communications Network.

Notable weekend programming includes the Sure Word Ministries radio program on Saturday mornings and Willingheart Radio on Saturday afternoons.

History
The station was operated as WIXC from December 1970 through May 1991, except for 11 months between 1984 and 1985 when the station was briefly known as WKZF. "WIXC (pronounced wicks-see) in Dixie" ran country and oldies formats at varying points over 20 years. The station was originally licensed to Fayetteville, Tennessee, across the state line from Hazel Green.

In January 1991, WIXC's then-owners, Lincoln County Broadcasters, Inc., reached an agreement to sell the station to Low Country Corporation, Inc. The deal was approved by the Federal Communications Commission on March 12, 1991, and the transaction was consummated on March 22, 1991. On May 15, 1991, the new owners had the FCC change the station's callsign from WIXC to WBXR.

In July 1997, Low Country Corporation reached an agreement to sell WBXR to New England Communications, Inc. The deal was approved by the FCC on September 2, 1997, and the transaction was consummated on September 16, 1997.

In 2016, Wilkins Radio started broadcasting on an FM signal, (W267GC) 101.3, in Huntsville, Alabama.  The programming on FM 101.3 is a simulcast of WBXR AM 1140.  The format continues with Urban Gospel music, preaching and talk shows.

References

External links
 WBXR official website

BXR
BXR
Radio stations established in 1970
1970 establishments in Tennessee
BMR